Adrianus (113–193) was a sophist of ancient Athens

Adrianus is a Latin form of the name Adrian. It is popular in the Low countries, where Latinized christian names or baptismal name were common from the 15th century until recently, especially after the papacy in 1522–23 of homegrown Adrianus VI,  who had been baptized "Adrianus" in 1459, as this event fell on the name day of Saint Adrian. People with the given name Adrianus generally use a short form in daily life, like Aad, Ad, Adri, Adriaan, Adrian, Adrie, Ard, Ariaan, Arian, Arie, Ariën, Aris, Arjan, Arjen, or Janus.

Adrianus may also refer to:

Before 1500
Adrianus (poet), Greek poet who wrote an epic poem on the history of Alexander the Great
Saint Adrianus (died 306), Roman officer and Christian martyr
Adrianus Africanus (died 710), Abbot of St Augustine's Abbey in Canterbury
Adrianus I (died 795), pope from 772 to 795
Adrianus II (792–872), pope from 867 to 872
Adrianus III (died 885), pope from 884 to 885
Adrianus Comnenus (fl. 1100), Byzantine aristocrat and general
Adrianus IV (c.1100–1159), pope from 1154 to 1159
Adrianus V (c.1215–1276), pope in 1276
Adrianus VI (1459–1523), pope from 1522 to 1523
Adrianus Barlandus (1486–1538), Dutch historian
Adrianus Petit Coclico (1499–1562), Netherlandish Renaissance composer

Academics, science and technology
Adrianus G. "Adriaan" Camper (1759–1820), Dutch mathematician, politician and paleontologist
Adrianus D. "Adriaan" de Groot (1914–2006), Dutch psychologist and chess player
Adrianus "Adriaan" Heereboord (1613–1661), Dutch philosopher and logician
Adrianus "Aad" de Hoop (born 1927), Dutch electrical engineer
Adrianus H.J. "Ad" Kolnaar (born 1942), Dutch economist
Adrianus F.J.M.M. "Ad" Konings (born 1956), Dutch ichthyologist
Adrianus Metius (1571–1635), Dutch geometer and astronomer
Adrianus "Aad" Nuis (1933–2007), Dutch political scientist
Adrianus Relandus (1676–1718), Dutch scholar, cartographer and philologist
Adrianus Romanus (1561–1615), Flemish mathematician
Adrianus "Adriaan" van Royen (1704–1779), Dutch botanist
Adrianus Saravia (1532–1612), Flemish theologian active in England
Adrianus Spigelius (1578–1625), Flemish anatomist
Adrianus Turnebus (1512–1565), French classical scholar

Arts and letters
Adrianus Bleijs (1842–1912), Dutch architect
Adrianus Johannes Ehnle (1819–1863), Dutch painter 
Adrianus Eversen (1818–1897), Dutch painter 
:de:Adrianus Michiel de Jong (1888–1943), Dutch author
Adrianus Marinus Kyvon (born 1947), Dutch comedian and actor
:nl:Adrianus Cornelis van Leeuwen (1887–1991), Dutch composer
Adrianus "Adriaan" Roland Holst (1888–1976), Dutch writer and poet
Adrianus W. "Arie" Smit (1916–2016), Dutch-born Indonesian painter
Adrianus Valerius (c. 1575–1625), Dutch poet and composer 
Adrianus Jacobus Zuijderland (1810–1897), Dutch model for Vincent van Gogh
Adrianus Zwart (1903–1981), Dutch painter

Law, politics and religion
:de:Adrianus Cornelis de Bruijn (1887–1968), Dutch government minister
Adrianus Djajasepoetra (1894–1979), Indonesian Roman Catholic archbishop
Adrianus J. "Ad" Hermes (1929–2002), Dutch politician
Adrianus van Kleffens (1899–1973), Dutch judge
Adrianus Antonie Henri Willem König (1867–1944), Dutch government minister
Adrianus H. "Ad" van Luyn (born 1935), Dutch Roman Catholic bishop
Adrianus P. W. "Ad" Melkert (born 1956), Dutch politician
:fr:Adrianus Poirters (1605–1674), Flemish Jesuit and writer
Adrianus Johannes Simonis (born 1931), Dutch Cardinal of the Catholic Church

Sports
Adrianus "Arie" Bieshaar (1899–1965), Dutch footballer
Adrianus "Janus" Braspennincx (1903–1977), Dutch cyclist
Adrianus "Ad" Dekkers (born 1953), Dutch cyclist
Adrianus F. Th. van der Heijden (born 1951), Dutch writer
Adrianus "Arie" de Jong (1882–1966), Dutch fencer
Adrianus "Adrie" Koster (born 1954), Dutch football player and coach
Adrianus A.C. "Adrie" van Kraay (born 1953), Dutch footballer
Adrianus "Janus" van Merrienboer (1894–1947), Dutch archer
Adrianus "Aad" van Mil (born 1957), Dutch water polo player
Adrianus "Ard" Schenk (born 1944), Dutch speedskater
Adrianus C. "Janus" Theeuwes (1886–1975), Dutch archer
Adrianus "Adri" van Tiggelen (born 1957), Dutch footballer
Adrianus P. "André" van Troost (born 1972), Dutch cricketer
Adrianus "Adri" Voorting (1931–1961), Dutch cyclist 
Adrianus "Arjan" de Zeeuw (born 1970), Dutch footballer

See also

Dutch masculine given names
Latin masculine given names